Dunnet Head Lighthouse is an active 19th century lighthouse that stands on the  cliff top of Easter Head on Dunnet Head. The lighthouse was automated in 1989, and the keepers were withdrawn. It is now checked remotely by the Northern Lighthouse Board operations centre in Edinburgh.

See also 

 List of lighthouses in Scotland
 List of Northern Lighthouse Board lighthouses

References

External links 

 Northern Lighthouse Board

Lighthouses completed in 1831
Lighthouses in Scotland
Category B listed lighthouses
Works of Robert Stevenson (civil engineer)